Ellis Hopkins Corman (22 September 1894 – 9 August 1956) was a Canadian politician, canner, farmer and fruit grower. Corman served as a Liberal party member of the House of Commons of Canada. He was born in Stoney Creek, Ontario.

Corman attained a Bachelor of Applied Science degree at the University of Toronto.

He was first elected to Parliament at the Wentworth riding in the 1940 general election after an unsuccessful attempt to win that riding in 1935 federal election from Conservative incumbent Frank Lennard. In the 1945 election, Lennard (who by that time was a Progressive Conservative) defeated Corman.

References

External links
 

1894 births
1956 deaths
Canadian farmers
Liberal Party of Canada MPs
Members of the House of Commons of Canada from Ontario
Politicians from Hamilton, Ontario
University of Toronto alumni